The 2021 Wimbledon Championships – Men's Singles Qualifying is a series of tennis matches that was originally scheduled to take place from 21 to 24 June 2021. However, due to a heavy rain on the first day, it was rescheduled from 22 to 25 June 2021, to determine the sixteen qualifiers into the main draw of the 2021 Wimbledon Championships – Men's singles, and, if necessary, the lucky losers.

Players who neither have high enough rankings nor receive wild cards for the main draw may participate in the qualifying tournament for the annual Wimbledon Tennis Championships.

This was the last appearance for the former world number 12 Viktor Troicki. He lost in the second round to Brandon Nakashima.

Seeds

Qualifiers

Lucky losers

Qualifying draw

First qualifier

Second qualifier

Third qualifier

Fourth qualifier

Fifth qualifier

Sixth qualifier

Seventh qualifier

Eighth qualifier

Ninth qualifier

Tenth qualifier

Eleventh qualifier

Twelfth qualifier

Thirteenth qualifier

Fourteenth qualifier

Fifteenth qualifier

Sixteenth qualifier

References

Gentlemen's Singles Qualifying draw
2021 Wimbledon Championships – Men's draws and results at the International Tennis Federation

Men's Singles Qualifying
Wimbledon Championships - Men's Singles Qualifying
Wimbledon Championship by year – Men's singles qualifying